Manuel Martínez Barrionuevo (1857, Málaga – 5 January 1917) was a Spanish poet, writer, and journalist.  Barrionuevo had a prolific career and contributed to the periodicals El Progreso, Bandera Liberal, and Diaro Mercantil, and wrote novels, plays, and poetry.

1857 births
1917 deaths
People from Málaga
Spanish dramatists and playwrights
Spanish male dramatists and playwrights
Spanish journalists
Spanish novelists
Spanish male novelists
Spanish poets
Spanish male poets